Hallaryd is a locality situated in Älmhult Municipality, Kronoberg County, Sweden.

Populated places in Kronoberg County
Populated places in Älmhult Municipality